The Church of All Saints is the parish church of Aston cum Aughton in South Yorkshire, England. It is a Church of England church in the Diocese of Sheffield. The building is a Grade I listed building and dates back the 12th century.

History
There was a church on this site at the time of the Domesday survey in 1086, but the current building was originally constructed in the late 12th century. The building was extensively remodelled in the late 14th and 15th centuries, and the chancel was rebuilt in the 19th century.

See also
Grade I listed buildings in South Yorkshire
Listed buildings in Aston cum Aughton

References

Grade I listed churches in South Yorkshire
Church of England church buildings in South Yorkshire
12th-century church buildings in England